Cañada Larga Airport  is an airstrip serving the farming village of Cañada Larga in the Santa Cruz Department of Bolivia.

Cañada Larga is typical of the many small airstrips that dot the farming region east of the Bolivian Andes.

See also

Transport in Bolivia
List of airports in Bolivia

References

External links
OpenStreetMap - Cañada Larga
OurAirports - Cañada Larga
Fallingrain - Cañada Larga Airport
HERE/Nokia - Cañada Larga

Airports in Santa Cruz Department (Bolivia)